Joe Bruno is a Papua New Guinean rugby league footballer who represented Papua New Guinea national rugby league team in the 2013 World Cup.

Playing career
A former Rabaul Gurias prop in the semi professional digicel cup, he was a foundation player with the PNG Hunters and is  now part of the PNG Hunters coaching staff who compete in the Intrust super Cup. His position is at prop.

References

1985 births
Papua New Guinean rugby league players
Papua New Guinea national rugby league team players
Rabaul Gurias players
Rugby league hookers
Living people
Papua New Guinea Hunters players